Nomina im Indogermanischen Lexikon (NIL, "Nominals in the Indo-European Lexicon") is an etymological dictionary of the Proto-Indo-European (PIE) nominals, that is, nouns and adjectives. It appeared in 2008, edited by German linguists Dagmar S. Wodtko, Britta Irslinger, and Carolin Schneider. Like other modern PIE dictionaries, NIL utilizes the modern three-laryngeal theory for its reconstructions.

History
During the 2000s, scientists at the University of Freiburg worked on a project called "Indogermanisches Nomen" ("Indo-European Nominal"), comprising a volume on nominal inflection, to become part of Manfred Mayrhofer's series on Indo-European grammar; a dictionary called Lexikon der indogermanischen Nomina (LIN, "Lexicon of the Indo-European Nominals" in analogy to the Lexikon der indogermanischen Verben, LIV); and a work on PIE primary adjectives. Eventually, the project was cancelled due to cutting of funds.

In 2008, a reduced version of the LIN was published under the title Nomina im Indogermanischen Lexikon. It includes only a limited selection of words and is lacking the planned grammatical section, which should have listed PIE nominal inflection types (again in analogy to the LIV) along with their scope of use and syntactic implications. Still, an overview of PIE mechanisms for deriving nominals from verbs – root nouns, suffixes, vṛddhi derivations, etc. – is included.

Entries
Part of the entries are based on noun stems (for example  'horse') or adjectival stems ( 'deep'), while a large number of PIE nominals are derived from verbal roots (such as  'shine, glow').

The entries are modelled on the concept of the LIV. Each contains
 the conjectured meaning of the stem or root,
 reconstructed stems and derivations with their reflexes in the daughter languages,
 extensive footnotes (with references, remarks on alternative and dubious reconstructions, etc., sometimes exceeding ten pages for a single entry),
 the page numbers of the corresponding LIV, IEW, EIEC and LIPP entries, where they exist.

The daughter languages often have changed the meanings of inherited words. Consequently, many of NILs entries contain words with widely different meanings. For example, the entry  'deep' treats the Lithuanian words dubùs 'deep' and dubuõ 'bowl, pelvis', Old Irish dub(o/ā) 'dark, black', and Albanian det 'sea', among many others.  'shine, glow' lists derivatives with meanings as diverse as 'a light, insight, appearance, wrath, white, clean.'

See also
 Proto-Indo-European nominals

Other PIE dictionaries and grammars
Grundriß der vergleichenden Grammatik der indogermanischen Sprachen (published 1886–1916 by Karl Brugmann and Berthold Delbrück)
Indogermanisches etymologisches Wörterbuch (IEW, first published 1956 by Julius Pokorny), with reconstructions pre-dating laryngeal theory
 Indo-European Etymological Dictionary, an ongoing project based in Leiden, intended to result in the publication of a comprehensive Indo-European etymological dictionary

References

External links

Pokorny PIE Data (University of Texas)
Indogermanisches Wörterbuch by Gerhard Köbler  (based on the IEW and including laryngeal-based reconstructions, but only as alternative lemmas with cross references to the pre-laryngeal ones)

2008 non-fiction books
Indo-European linguistics works
Etymological dictionaries